Trans TV is an Indonesian free-to-air television network based in South Jakarta that was launched on December 15, 2001 and owned by Chairul Tanjung. Programming consists of newscasts, movies, drama series, variety shows, quiz shows, and children's television series. Trans TV was Indonesia's main broadcaster of the 2018 FIFA World Cup, showing most group matches and all of the final matches, which led to the channel topping Indonesian television ratings as of June 19, 2018.

History

Construction

Trans TV was incorporated under a license from the Department of Trade and Industry, South Jakarta with Number 809/BH.09.05/III/1998. Its shares are primarily owned by the Para Inti Investindo, a subsidiary of Para Group. In August 1998, Trans TV's existence was published in State Gazette No. 8687 as PT Televisi Transformasi Indonesia. At the time, Trans TV was obtaining permission to broadcast, initially planned in October 1998 based in Jakarta, was operating from Trans TV Television Centre Headquarters at Jalan Kapten Pierre Tendean No. 12-14A in Mampang Prapatan, South Jakarta in Jakarta it born names Televisi Transformasi Indonesia (Trans TV) was granted a broadcasting license.

Metropolitan techinican broadcasts

Its technician stations started television broadcasting metropolitan on July 1st, 2001 at 16:00 local time it began trial transmission in Jabodetabek (the area surrounding Jakarta), Trans TV currently broadcasts via UHF (Ultra high frequency) was located on UHF channel 29 in the Jabodetabek (via Jakarta) with the pattern of broadcasting techniques for runtime three hours on daily at Trans TV Television Centre Headquarters at Jalan Kapten Pierre Tendean No. 12-14A in Mampang Prapatan, South Jakarta  for the trial of technician stations form 3 months between July 1st, 2001 to September 30th, 2001.

Metropolitan trial programs

Trans TV's trial transmission stations started television broadcasting metropolitan programs aired Trans-Tune in was officially inaugurated from Bandung and surroundings on October 1st, 2001 at 16:00 local time afternoon. It was aired network by Kamera had started a test of transmission was officially launched from Bandung Supermal most extensive in the Capital of the West Java. Later, Trans TV was introduced to the public. Studio stage, the two hosts bring interactive quizzes to attract potential audience members, while presenting a series of music video clips. The program presents the News Division, which contains features both primetime evening-nightly, main prime news bulletin actual programs aired Berita Hari Ini (News Today) was broadcast for 30 minutes (mid-hours) and one news journalist reader for male and female, with the pattern of broadcasting techniques for runtime a 2-hours on daily at Trans TV Television Centre Headquarters at Jalan Kapten Pierre Tendean No. 12-14A in Mampang Prapatan, South Jakarta in Jakarta.

Trial of transmission

The channel officially started its trial broadcasts on October 25th, 2001 at 16:00 WIB. It began trial transmission in Jabodetabek (the Jakarta surrounding area) and Bandung via UHF (Ultra high frequency) and it was located on UHF channel 29 in the Jabodetabek (via Jakarta) and UHF channel 42 in Bandung. It was the first time a channel tested its broadcast for two cities rather than inn one city. Its trial broadcast lasted for 45 days between October 25th, 2001, and November 15th, 2001 at Trans TV Television Centre Headquarters at Jalan Kapten Pierre Tendean No. 12-14A in Mampang Prapatan, South Jakarta.

Test of transmission

Its test of transmission trial stations started television broadcasting nationwide in Ramadhan 2001 at 16:00 local time afternoon it began trial transmission in Jabodetabek (the area surrounding Jakarta). Trans-Tune was officially renamed Transvaganza it was runtime broadcasting 6 hours on each day. Trans TV started showing American movies and television series for starting television broadcasting for 29 days between  November 16th, 2001, and December 14th, 2001 at Trans TV Television Centre Headquarters at Jalan Kapten Pierre Tendean No. 12-14A in Mampang Prapatan, South Jakarta in Jakarta. Trans TV went on air for the first time in a trial of broadcasts to seven cities including: Jabodetabek (via Jakarta, UHF 29), Bandung (UHF 42), Semarang (UHF 29), Yogyakarta (UHF 24), Solo (UHF 24), Surabaya (UHF 22) and Medan (UHF 27) was introduced in November 2001.

Opening

Trans TV officially opened television broadcasting on-air nationwide on December 15, 2001, In the Jabodetabek (via Jakarta) the UHF channel for Trans TV is channel 29. Trans TV was went on air for the first time in a trial of broadcasts to seven cities such as: Jakarta (UHF 29), Bandung (UHF 42), Semarang (UHF 29), Yogyakarta (UHF 24), Solo (UHF 24), Surabaya (UHF 22) and Medan (UHF 27). Other Indonesian cities are expected to follow later through establishment of national television stations that relayed television broadcast of Trans TV. This channel is only available from pay and satellite television on Indovision platform on channel 87, First Media platform on channel 9 and Palapa C2 satellite. Trans TV was launched started on Decembe 15, 2001.

Slogans 
 Milik Kita Bersama (Ours Together) (2001-present)
 The Hottest TV Channel (2004-2005)
 Setia Menemani (Faithful Accompany) (2021-present, sekunder)

Programs
Trans TV programming includes variety shows such as Extravaganza, The Dorce Show, and Indonesian versions of Thank God You're Here (Akhirnya Datang Juga) and The Gong Show. It also broadcasts religious programs, movies, gossip shows, soap operas and regular news.

Sports programming
Trans TV has broadcast every Thomas & Uber Cup since 2002 (except 2006 on Lativi and 2010 on Trans7). Sport programs including 2002 Tiger Cup, La Liga and Copa del Rey in 2001–2003. Since 2012, Trans TV has broadcast football match of the FA Community Shield, La Liga (together with Trans7), Copa del Rey (exclude final match), England National Football, and the British FA Cup.

Since December 15, 2017, Trans Media, with Telkom Indonesia, Kompas Gramedia and MNC Media (MNC Vision only) officially obtained the broadcasting rights for 2018 FIFA World Cup.

International programming
 The Flash
 iZombie
 Arrow
 Gotham
 EXO's Showtime
 The Last Empress

Presenters

Current

Former
 Asran Shady (now at Indosiar)
 Osa Budi Santosa
 Riza Primadi
 Iwan Ahmad Sudirwan (now at TVR Parlemen)
 Budi Irawan
 Muhammad Rizky (now at tvOne)
 Noni Wibisono
 Yudi Yudawan (now at CNN Indonesia)
 Leman
 Ratna Dumila
 Reza Prahadian
 Tina Talisa
 Fitri Megantara (now at MetroTV)
 Dian Mirza (now at CNBC Indonesia)
 Budi Irawan
 Pramesywara Adisendjaya (now at iNews)
 Virgianty Kusumah
 Ryan Wiedaryanto (now at Indosiar)
 Utrich Farzah (now at Indosiar)
 Woro Windrati (now at Kompas TV)
 Zulfikar Naghi (now at Indosiar)
 Gede Satria (now at iNews)
 Adita Nanda
 Loviana Dian (now at Polri TV)
 Alyssa Akilie
 Andromeda Amanda
 Anisa Sulandana
 Arrumaisha Rani
 Anie Rahmi (now at MetroTV)
 Aryadita Utama
 Berdho Alase
 Christian Reinaldo
 Daisy Weku
 Deddy Zebua
 Dewi Fatma
 Fransisca Rathy
 Kaze Pury
 Lisa Namuri Arif
 Nabil Basalamah
 Ranggani Puspandya
 Rheini Abhinawa
 Rizki Washarti Siregar
 Suci Lee
 Yasmin Muntaz
 Novieta Putri
 Prabu Revolusi (now at RCTI, MNC News and BuddyKu)
 Ferdi Hasan
 Rieke Diah Pitaloka
 Shahnaz Mariela
 Inez Tagor
 Edwin Manangsang
 Ahmad Alhabsyi
 Subki Al Bughury
 Divi Lukmansyah
 Shanta Curanggana
 Seila Siregar
 Bayu Andrianto (now at tvOne)
 Nawayogi Kusuma (now at RCTI)
 Berdho Alase
 Anggi Agasi
 Dwi Saraswati
 Rury Demsy
 Putri Ayudya
 Iqbal Kurniadi (now at CNN Indonesia)
 Ivan Kurnia
 Budi Adiputro
 Tifanny Raytama (now at CNN Indonesia)
 Kelly Charenina
 Bunga Harum Dani (now at TVRI)
 Reni Risty
 Harly Valentina
 Riska Amelia (now at Polri TV)
 Saesarez Novandito

See also
List of television stations in Indonesia
Trans7

References

External links
 

Television networks in Indonesia
Television channels and stations established in 2001
Trans Media